Joe Newhouse (born September 22, 1977) is an American politician who has served in the Oklahoma Senate from the 25th district since 2016.

Early life and career
Newhouse was born in Miles City, MT and graduated from Broken Arrow High School, Oklahoma. He completed his senior year as an exchange student in Germany*1 at the CJD Christophorusschule Gymnasium Versmold. He graduated from Georgetown University with a major in International Economics and earned a masters degree in Organizational Leadership from Chapman University (Los Angeles, CA). As a Navy pilot he flew combat in the Iraq War in the EA-6B Prowler from the USS Nimitz carrier and was awarded the Air Medal. He taught air to air combat in the T-45C at Navy Flight School in Pensacola, FL and was named Instructor Pilot of the Year – 2009. He promoted to the rank of Commander in the Navy Reserves in 2016*1,4,10. He is a certified PMP®*5 and owns a real estate investment firm.

Political career
Newhouse was elected to the Oklahoma Senate in 2016 and re-elected in 2020 and represents District 25, which includes South Tulsa County. His Conservative Index score tied for 5th highest among all 48 Senators in the 2017 and 2019 legislative sessions according to The Oklahoma Constitution. His legislation has focused on tax reform, military and veterans issues, self protection rights, and mental health initiatives. He has conducted political update interviews in Spanish with Telemundo Oklahoma, and he also speaks German. During the 2nd year of his term, he was temporarily recalled to active duty in support of counter-terrorism operations in North Africa.

References

1977 births
Living people
People from Broken Arrow, Oklahoma
Republican Party Oklahoma state senators
21st-century American politicians